Julia Cornelia Paula (lived 3rd century AD) was a distinguished Roman noblewoman who became Empress of Rome as the first wife of the Roman emperor Elagabalus, who divorced her.

Life 
Paula was a lady, according to Herodian, of very noble descent: a member of the gens Cornelia through her maternal line, her father, Julius Paulus, was an important jurist active throughout the Severan Dynasty, who subsequently served as praetorian prefect between 228 and 235.

In early 219, Julia Maesa, eldest sister of dowager empress Julia Domna, arranged for Cornelia Paula to marry her grandson, the new emperor Elagabalus. Their wedding was lavishly celebrated in Rome. Cornelia Paula, Elagabalus' first wife, was given the honorific title Augusta.

In late 220, Elagabalus divorced her to marry the Vestal Virgin Aquilia Severa in a union that was considered scandalous because she was still a Vestal. Apart from falling in love with Severa, Elagabalus married Severa as a part of the religious process of worshiping the Syrian Sun God El-Gabal and integrating El-Gabal into Roman religion.

After the divorce, Elagabalus removed Paula's Augusta title and reduced her to a private station. They had no children and her subsequent fate is unknown.

References

Bibliography 
 "Emperor Elagabalus", The Roman Empire: People & The Decline, n.d. Retrieved 5 February 2022.
 "Julia Paula", Forvm Ancient Coins: NumisWiki, n.d. Retrieved 5 February 2022.
 Meckler, Michael L. "Elagabalus (218-222 A.D.)", De Imperatoribus Romanis: An Online Encyclopedia of Roman Emperors, 26 August 1997. Retrieved 5 February 2022.
Ramsay, William. "Paula, Julia Cornelia" In William Smith (ed.) Dictionary of Greek and Roman Biography and Mythology. 3. Boston: Little, Brown & Co., 1867.

Sources 
 Herodian 5.6.1.
 Cassius Dio 79.9.

Julii
Cornelii
Year of birth unknown
Year of death unknown
Augustae
Wives of Elagabalus
3rd-century Roman empresses